Abdallah Khaled Deeb Salim is a Jordanian footballer who plays for Al-Salt.

Personal life and family
Abdallah is married and has a daughter named Zain, he is the son of former Jordanian football star Khaled Salim.

International career
Abdallah's first match with the Jordan national senior team was against Bahrain in a friendly international on 7 September 2007 in Muharraq, which Jordan won 3-1.

Abdallah was the top scorer of the 2011 Pan Arab Games football tournament, scoring two goals against Palestine in group stage and two goals against Kuwait in the semifinals.

International goals

Under-20
Scores and results list the Jordan's goal tally first.

Senior Team
Scores and results list Jordan's goal tally first.

International career statistics

See also
 List of men's footballers with 100 or more international caps

References

 
 Abdallah Deeb Officially Signs Up for Shabab Al-Ordon
 
 
 Top Scorer of the 2011 Pan Arab Games
 Abdallah Deeb: "The Upcoming Will be Better for Al-Wehdat SC"
 Abdallah Deeb: "I Couldn't Get Some Sleep After Our Match With Japan...And Shafia Saved Me From the Wrath of Our Fans"
 Deeb and Shelbaieh Both Share the Title of Top Scorer of the League 2012/2013
 Jordanian Abdallah Deeb Signs Up for Al-Orubah (KSA)
 Jordanian Abdallah Deeb: "I Feel Psychological Comfort With Al-Orubah (KSA)... And I'm Anxious for Al-Wehdat SC"
 rsssf.com

External links
 
 
 
 
 
 
 Player info at Sporza.be 
 

1987 births
Living people
Association football forwards
Jordanian footballers
Jordanian people of Palestinian descent
Jordanian expatriate footballers
Jordanian expatriate sportspeople in Bahrain
Jordanian expatriate sportspeople in Saudi Arabia
Jordanian expatriate sportspeople in Belgium
Jordan international footballers
Jordan youth international footballers
Belgian Pro League players
K.V. Mechelen players
Al-Wehdat SC players
Riffa SC players
Al-Ansar FC (Medina) players
Expatriate footballers in Saudi Arabia
Expatriate footballers in Bahrain
Expatriate footballers in Belgium
2011 AFC Asian Cup players
2015 AFC Asian Cup players
Shabab Al-Ordon Club players
Al-Orobah FC players
Sportspeople from Amman
FIFA Century Club
Saudi Professional League players
Saudi First Division League players
Bahraini Premier League players